Thomas Carper is an American poet. His work has appeared in Poetry, The American Scholar, The Formalist, and The Review (London).

Awards
2003 Richard Wilbur Award

Works
"The First-born", Beloit Poetry Journal 29 (Spring 1979), 7.
Distant Blue, University of Evansville Press, October 2003, 
From Nature, Johns Hopkins University Press, 1995, 
Fiddle Lane, Johns Hopkins University Press, 1991, 
Musicians: poems, Aralia Press, 1990
Meter and meaning: an introduction to rhythm in poetry, Thomas Carper, Derek Attridge, Routledge, 2003,

Anthologies
The Maine Poets: An Anthology, Wesley McNair, editor, Down East Books, November 25, 2003, 
"Turning in Bed"; "That's a Nice Leg", Words brushed by music: twenty-five years of the Johns Hopkins poetry series, Editor John T. Irwin, JHU Press, 2004,

References

External links
"Poetry Midterm" poetry helena
"Fiddle Lane, rev. Marion K. Stocking", Beloit Poetry Journal, 42 (Summer 1992), 44.

American male poets
20th-century American poets
Living people
Year of birth missing (living people)
21st-century American poets
20th-century American male writers
21st-century American male writers